A public-sector trade union (or public-sector labor union) is a trade union which primarily represents the interests of employees within public sector or governmental organizations.

History
Labor unions generally bypassed government employees because they were controlled mostly by the patronage system used by the political parties before the arrival of civil service.

Postal unions
Post Office workers did form unions. The National Association of Letter Carriers started in 1889 and grew quickly. It had  52 branches with 4,600 members in 1890, and 335 branches by 1892. It focused on forcing postmasters to honor federal law mandating an 8-hour day for federal employees. In 1893 it won a Supreme Court decision and $3.5 million in back overtime pay.  Local postmasters vigorously opposed the union.  It joined the American Federation of Labor (AFL) in 1917.  By the mid-1960s it had 175,000 members in 6,400 local branches.

Two organizations of postal clerks emerged in the 1890s; they merged in 1899 into the United National Association of Post Office Clerks (UNAPOC).  It was too conservative for the AFL, which in 1906 sponsored the National Federation of Post Office Clerks (NFPOC), which soon surpassed the UNAPOC.  NFPOC grew from 16,000 members in 1922 36,000 in 1932, and nearly 50,000 by 1940. It did not engage in strikes, but spent much of its efforts in opposing hostile Congressional legislation.  Additional rivals were formed in the 1930s but the first serious rival was the National Postal Clerks Union (NPCU) that began in 1958 and by 1970 reach the membership of 80,000.  Merger discussions dragged on for years, until the NFPOC, UNMAPOC and others merged in 1961 as the United Federation of Postal Clerks.  Another round of mergers in 1971 produced the American Postal Workers Union (APWU).  In 2012 the APWU had 330,000 members.

The postal unions did not engage in strikes, but there was the U.S. postal strike of 1970, a two-week wildcat walkout in New York City and 12 other cities by 200,000 of the 750,000 postal employees. It was not officially sponsored and ended when the Army started delivering the mail in "Operation Graphic Hand."

1919

Historian Joseph Slater, says, "Unfortunately for public sector unions, the most searing and enduring image of their history in the first half of the twentieth century was the Boston police strike. The strike was routinely cited by courts and officials through the end of the 1940s."

In 2009 the U.S. membership of public sector unions surpassed membership of private sector unions for the first time, at 7.9m and 7.4m respectively.

In 2011 states faced a growing fiscal crisis and the Republicans had made major gains in the 2010 elections. Public sector unions came under heavy attack especially in Wisconsin, as well as Indiana, New Jersey and Ohio from conservative Republican legislatures. Conservative state legislatures tried to drastically reduce the abilities of unions to collectively bargain.  Conservatives argued that public unions were too powerful since they helped elect their bosses, and that overly generous pension systems were too heavy a drain on state budgets.

See also
 Public-sector trade union for rest of world

References

Further reading
 Edwards, Chris. "Public-Sector Unions." Benefits 17.10.47 (2010): 1-68.
 Freeman, Richard B., and Eunice Han. "The war against public sector collective bargaining in the US." Journal of Industrial Relations (2012)  54#3 pp: 386-408.
 Katz, Harry C. "Is US Public Sector Labor Relations in the Midst of a Transformation?." Industrial and Labor Relations Review 66 (2013): 1031-1212.
 Kearney, Richard C., and Patrice M. Mareschal. Labor relations in the public sector CRC Press, 2014.
 Krinsky, John. "Neoliberal Times Intersecting Temporalities and the Neoliberalization of New York City's Public-Sector Labor Relations." Social Science History (2011)  35#3 pp: 381-422.
 Moe, Terry M. Special Interest: Teachers Unions and America's Public Schools (2011) 
 Murphy, Marjorie. Blackboard Unions: The AFT and the NEA, 1900-1980 (1992)
  Steier, Richard. Enough Blame to Go Around: The Labor Pains of New York City's Public Employee Unions (2014)
 Tucker, David L. "The Psychology of Government Employment" (1999)  /  "Public Sector Union Handbook" (1998) 
 McGinnis, John O., and Max Schanzenbach. "The Case Against Public Sector Unions" (2010)

Labor relations

Trade unions